The Hunter 23 is an American trailerable sailboat, that was designed by Hunter Marine and first built in 1985.

Production
The design was built by Hunter Marine in the United States from 1985 and 1992, but it is now out of production.

Design

The Hunter 23 is a small recreational keelboat, built predominantly of fiberglass, with wood trim. It has a fractional sloop rig, a raked stem, a reverse transom, a transom-hung rudder controlled by a tiller and a fixed wing keel or centerboard. It displaces  and carries  of ballast.

The boat is normally fitted with a small  outboard motor for docking and maneuvering.

The design has sleeping accommodation for four people, with a double "V"-berth in the bow cabin, and two straight settees in the main cabin that can be converted into a full-wideth double berth. The galley is located on the port side just aft of the companionway ladder. The galley is equipped with a single-burner stove and a sink. The head is located in the bow cabin under the "V"-berth.

The wing keel version has a PHRF racing average handicap of 237 with a high of 258 and low of 226. The centerboard version has a PHRF racing average handicap of 237 with a high of 219 and low of 276.

Operational history
In a 2010 review Steve Henkel wrote, "Best features: Although the V-berth forward is only large enough for two children or one adult, owners may feel compensated by having the ability to convert the entire main cabin into a double bed (the full 8-foot width of the hull), by utilizing floorboards as supports and seatbacks as cushions. Worst features: Owners have reported leaking around the keel bolts and around the rudder gudgeons. Another source of annoyance has been the boat's tendency to sit down in the water by the port quarter, a result of putting batteries, water tank, and the transom-mounted outboard engine all in the aft quarter to port."

See also

List of sailing boat types

Similar sailboats
Beneteau First 235
Bluenose one-design sloop
O'Day 23
Paceship 23
Paceship PY 23
Precision 23
Rob Roy 23
Schock 23
Sonic 23
Starwind 223
Stone Horse
Watkins 23

References

External links

Original official manuafactuer's brochure

Keelboats
1980s sailboat type designs
Sailing yachts
Sailboat type designs by Hunter Design Team
Sailboat types built by Hunter Marine